Violaines is a commune in the Pas-de-Calais department in the Hauts-de-France region of France.

Geography

Population

Places of interest
 The church of St.Vaast, rebuilt along with much of the village, after World War I.
 The war memorial.
 The Commonwealth War Graves Commission cemetery.

International relations

Violaine is twinned with:

  Schwerte-Wandhofen in Germany

See also
Communes of the Pas-de-Calais department

References

External links

 Regional website 
 The CWGC graves in the commune's cemetery

Communes of Pas-de-Calais